Walker Township is one of twelve townships in Rush County, Indiana. As of the 2010 census, its population was 856 and it contained 364 housing units.

Walker Township was organized in 1826.

Geography

Unincorporated towns
 Manilla at 
 Homer at 
(This list is based on USGS data and may include former settlements.)

References

External links
 Indiana Township Association
 United Township Association of Indiana

Townships in Rush County, Indiana
Townships in Indiana